The Kvichak River (Yup'ik: Kuicaraq) is a large river, about  long, in southwestern Alaska in the United States. It flows southwest from Lake Iliamna to Kvichak Bay, an arm of Bristol Bay, on the Alaska Peninsula. The communities of Igiugig and Levelock lie along the Kvichak River. The Kvichak is navigable along its entire length, and is used as a short cut by boats getting between Cook Inlet and Bristol Bay via the Lake Iliamna portage.

The Kvichak River is home to the largest red salmon run in the world. Commercial harvests are worth hundreds of millions of U.S. dollars annually.

The Kvichak River is part of the watershed downstream of the proposed Pebble Mine.

Historically, the river was navigated and subsistence fished by local Alaska Natives.  The name of the river means from- or up to- great water, a reference to Iliamna Lake, Alaska's largest freshwater lake.

The Kvichak River was a finalist for the 2017 Riverprize Award for being one of the best-managed and sustainable rivers in the world.

See also
List of rivers of Alaska

References

External links
Kvichak River Photos
Wildlife of the Kvichak and Nushagak watersheds – U.S. Fish and Wildlife Service

Rivers of Bristol Bay Borough, Alaska
Rivers of Lake and Peninsula Borough, Alaska
Rivers of Alaska